Michael Mental is an American College Football coach of the Weber State Wildcats. As a player, Mental was a three-year starting quarterback for the Baldwin Wallace Yellow Jackets, and earned a tryout with the Cleveland Browns after his college career ended. Mental later spent several seasons on the coaching staff of Notre Dame College ending with a two-year stint as head coach in 2020 and 2021. After these two years, Mental departed Notre Dame College to spend 2022 as the offensive coordinator of Weber State. After the 2022 season, Weber State head coach Jay Hill departed Weber State to join the coaching staff at BYU. After which, Mental was promoted to head coach of Weber State

Personal life
Mental is a native of Olmsted Falls, Ohio and attended Baldwin Wallace University. He is married to Jessica Mental

Head Coaching Record

References

Living people
American football quarterbacks
People from Olmsted Falls, Ohio
Players of American football from Ohio
Baldwin Wallace Yellow Jackets football players
Notre Dame College (Ohio)
Weber State Wildcats football coaches
Year of birth missing (living people)